Giovanni Agostino Marliani (1585 – 4 June 1674) was a Roman Catholic prelate who served as Bishop of Reggio Emilia (1662–1674) and Bishop of Accia and Mariana (1645–1656).

Biography
Giovanni Agostino Marliani was born of a patrician family in Genoa, Italy in 1585.

He is attested as Vicar General of the diocese of Genoa in 1635 and again in 1640.

On 15 July 1645, Marliani was appointed Bishop of Accia and Mariana by Pope Innocent X. In 1645, he was consecrated bishop by Stefano Durazzo, Archbishop of Genoa. In 1656, he resigned as Bishop of Accia and Mariana. 

On 27 February 1662, he was appointed Bishop of Reggio Emilia by Pope Alexander VII. He held a diocesan synod in Reggio on 15–17 June 1665. He held a second synod on 17–19 April 1674.

Marliani served as Bishop of Reggio Emilia until his death on 4 June 1674.

Episcopal succession
While bishop, he was the principal co-consecrator of:

References

External links and additional sources
 Saccani, Giovanni (1902). I vescovi di Reggio-Emilia, Cronotassi, Reggio Emilia: Tip. Artigianelli 1902, pp. 137-139. 

17th-century Italian Roman Catholic bishops
Bishops appointed by Pope Innocent X
Bishops appointed by Pope Alexander VII
1585 births
1674 deaths
17th-century Roman Catholic bishops in Genoa